Paul Marion may refer to:
Paul Marion (politician) (1899–1954), French politician
Paul Marion (actor) (1915–2011), American actor
J. Paul Marion (born 1927), politician from Manitoba, Canada
Paul Marion (university administrator), an American university administrator and academic